Bukhary is a rural locality (a village) in Karinskoye Rural Settlement, Alexandrovsky District, Vladimir Oblast, Russia. The population was 159 as of 2010. There are 4 streets.

Geography 
Bukhary is located 13 km southwest of Alexandrov (the district's administrative centre) by road. Daryino is the nearest rural locality.

References 

Rural localities in Alexandrovsky District, Vladimir Oblast
Alexandrovsky Uyezd (Vladimir Governorate)